Bul or BUL may refer to:
 Bulgaria
 Bul (game), a Mayan board game
 Bul FC, Ugandan football club
 BUL Transmark, an Israeli handgun manufacturer
 Bulgarian language
 Bulolo Airport in Papua New Guinea
 Buol Island, Indonesia
 Cheshvan, a Hebrew month
 Lee Bul (born 1964), South Korean sculptor
 PPS Bul, sister ship to the Papuan patrol vessel Euatel

See also 
 Bull (disambiguation)
 Buls (disambiguation)